Amata wallacei is a species of moth in the family Erebidae first described by Frederic Moore in 1859. It is found on Java, Sumatra, Peninsular Malaysia and Borneo.

The length of the forewings is 15–16 mm. Adults have five white spots on black forewings and two white spots on the hindwings. There are yellow rings at the base of the abdomen and on the sixth segment.

Subspecies
Amata wallacei wallacei (Java)
Amata wallacei paucicincta Holloway, 1988 (Java, Sumatra, Peninsular Malaysia, Borneo)

References

Moths described in 1858
wallacei
Moths of Asia